Rodolfo Tommasi (24 November 1907 – 13 August 1993) was an Italian footballer.

Born in Abbazia, Austria-Hungary, he played as forward for several Italian clubs. He started plying with local Olympia Abbazia, then he had a spell with ACF Fiorentina in the 1928–29 Divisione Nazionale.  Between 1929 and 1931 he played with Fiumana in the Serie B and then with Triestina in the 1931–32 Serie A.

He also played abroad, with BSK Belgrade in the 1932–33 Yugoslav Football Championship.  While playing in Yugoslavia he played as Rudolf Tomašić.

He died in his birthplace, in 1993, by then known as Opatija and part of Croatia.

References

1907 births
1993 deaths
People from Opatija
People from Austrian Littoral
Italian footballers
Italian expatriate footballers
Association football forwards
ACF Fiorentina players
U.S. Fiumana players
U.S. Triestina Calcio 1918 players
Serie A players
Serie B players
OFK Beograd players
Yugoslav First League players
Expatriate footballers in Yugoslavia
Italian expatriate sportspeople in Yugoslavia